The 2014 season was the 117th season of competitive football in Sweden. The competitive started with the group stage of Svenska Cupen on 1 March. League competition started late March and early April with Allsvenskan on 30 March, Superettan on 6 April, Damallsvenskan on 13 April and Division 1 on 20 April. Svenska Cupen ended with the final on 18 May. Damallsvenskan ended on 19 October, Allsvenskan and Division 1 ended on 1 November, Superettan one day later on 2 November and lower men's leagues on the weekend before. Qualification play-offs were held after the end of league play with the Allsvenskan and Superettan play-offs being held on 6 and 9 November. Svenska Supercupen was held on 9 November and was contested by the winner of Allsvenskan and Svenska Cupen. Sweden participated in qualifying for the UEFA Euro 2016.

Honours

Men's football

Official titles

Competitions

Women's football

Official titles

Competitions

Promotions, relegations and qualifications

Men's football

Promotions

Relegations

International qualifications

Domestic results

Men's football

2014 Allsvenskan

2014 Allsvenskan qualification play-offs

Gefle IF won 4–1 on aggregate.

2014 Superettan

2014 Superettan qualification play-offs

IK Frej won 5–3 on aggregate. 

1–1 on aggregate. Assyriska FF won on away goals.

2014 Division 1

Norra

Södra

2013–14 Svenska Cupen

Quarter-finals

Semi-finals

Final

2014 Svenska Supercupen

Women's football

2014 Damallsvenskan

Men's national team fixtures and results

Goalscorers

Swedish clubs' performance in Europe
These are the results of the Swedish teams in European competitions during the 2014–15 season. (Swedish team score displayed first)

Men's football

* For group games in UEFA Champions League, score in home game is displayed
** For group games in UEFA Champions League, score in away game is displayed

Women's football

Fotbollsgalan 
Fotbollsgalan is the annual award ceremony held by the Swedish Football Association to present individual awards for both men's and women's football. The award ceremony was held on 10 November 2014 at the Ericsson Globe in Stockholm after the end of the domestic season. The nominations for the 2014 season were officially announced on 20 October 2014. Only the general awards are presented here, for league specific awards, see the articles 2014 Allsvenskan and 2014 Damallsvenskan respectively. Nominees are displayed below, the winners are marked in bold text.

Men's goalkeeper of the year
Andreas Isaksson (Kasımpaşa)
Kristoffer Nordfeldt (Heerenveen)
Robin Olsen (Malmö FF)

Men's defender of the year
Andreas Granqvist (Krasnodar)
Mikael Antonsson (Copenhagen)
Filip Helander (Malmö FF)

Men's midfielder of the year
Albin Ekdal (Cagliari)
Jimmy Durmaz (Olympiacos)
Emil Forsberg (Malmö FF)

Men's forward of the year
Zlatan Ibrahimović (Paris Saint-Germain)
Markus Rosenberg (Malmö FF)
Lasse Vibe (IFK Göteborg)

Women's goalkeeper of the year
Hedvig Lindahl (Kristianstads DFF)
Hilda Carlén (Piteå IF)
Stephanie Labbé (KIF Örebro)

Women's defender of the year
Nilla Fischer (VfL Wolfsburg)
Lina Nilsson (FC Rosengård)
Linda Sembrant (Tyresö FF / Montpellier)

Women's midfielder of the year
Caroline Seger (Tyresö FF / Paris Saint-Germain)
Ramona Bachmann (FC Rosengård)
Mariann Gajhede Knudsen (Linköpings FC)

Women's forward of the year
Lotta Schelin (Lyon)
Manon Melis (Kopparbergs/Göteborg FC)
Anja Mittag (FC Rosengård)

Guldbollen
Zlatan Ibrahimović (Paris Saint-Germain)

Diamantbollen
Lotta Schelin (Lyon)

Referees of the year
Pernilla Larsson (Ladies)
Jonas Eriksson (Men)

Goal of the year
Magnus Eriksson (Malmö FF)

Fotbollskanalen's honorary award
Tommy Svensson

Notes

References 

 
Seasons in Swedish football